Anne Grommerch (11 December 1970 – 15 April 2016) was a French politician who was a member of the National Assembly of France.

Born in Thionville, she represented the Moselle department, and was a member of the Union for a Popular Movement. She replaced Jean-Marie Demange. Grommerch was also elected Mayor of Thionville in 2014.

Grommerch developed breast cancer in 2007; there is a family history of the disease. She died as a result of it on 15 April 2016 at the age of 45.

References

1970 births
2016 deaths
Women members of the National Assembly (France)
The Social Right
Mayors of places in Grand Est
Union for a Popular Movement politicians
People from Thionville
Deaths from breast cancer
Deaths from cancer in Luxembourg
21st-century French women politicians
20th-century French women politicians
Women mayors of places in France
Deputies of the 14th National Assembly of the French Fifth Republic